Kid Gang on the Go is a 1971 Danish comedy film directed by Annelise Reenberg and starring William Rosenberg.

Cast

William Rosenberg as Peter Berg
Jeanne Darville as Else Berg
Sonja Oppenhagen as Rikke Berg
Jan Priiskorn-Schmidt as Jan Berg
Vibeke Houlberg as Lotte Berg
Michael Rosenberg as Michael Berg
Pusle Helmuth as Pusle Berg
Lars Madsen as Blop
Katrine Salomon as Lille Mulle
Ditte Søndergaard as Lille Bøtte
Axel Strøbye as Onkel Erik Lund
Sigrid Horne-Rasmussen as Fru Jensen
Judy Gringer as Camilla Olsen
Karl Stegger as Advokat Andersen
Thecla Boesen as Edel Andersen
Niels Hinrichsen as Niels
Dirch Passer as Viggo
Jørgen Kiil as René
Ernst Meyer as Egon
Preben Mahrt as Havnefoged
Jens Østerholm as Svensk politimand

External links

1971 films
1971 comedy films
1970s Danish-language films
Films directed by Annelise Reenberg
Films scored by Sven Gyldmark
Danish comedy films